Charles Edward "Ceb" Barnes (13 November 1901 – 24 October 1998) was an Australian politician. He was a member of the Country Party and served in the House of Representatives from 1958 to 1972. He was a long-serving government minister as Minister for Territories (1963–1968) and External Territories (1968–1972), holding office under five prime ministers.

Early life 
Born in Einasleigh, Queensland, to wealthy grazier and racehorse breeder J. H. S. Barnes and his wife Sarah, Barnes was raised at farms near Hughenden and Warwick, Queensland. Educated in Sydney, Barnes left school at 17 to work for the Union Trustee Company. A cousin of Sir Michael Bruxner, a founder of the Country Party and its long-time leader in the New South Wales parliament, Barnes was also involved in the Country Party from a young age.

Barnes formed a gold mining syndicate in 1939, re-opening two old mines, the Louisa and British Lion, on the abandoned Palmer Goldfield of North Queensland. Results were disappointing, and wartime fuel rationing closed the operation in 1941. Barnes enlisted in the Royal Australian Air Force on 9 November 1942, serving in Australia and New Guinea and reaching the rank of Flying Officer before his discharge on 13 September 1944. Following World War II, Barnes purchased Canning Downs station from his father and developed it into a successful thoroughbred horse breeding operation. Barnes also became heavily involved in the local community, serving as a committee member of the Queensland Turf Club and president of the Warwick Show and Rodeo Society.

Barnes found success on the racetrack, with one horse, Basha Felika, winning the 1951 Caulfield Cup and another, Tails, finishing third in the 1971 Melbourne Cup, and considered the second best galloper in the country, after Tulloch. During his parliamentary career, Barnes would credit his horses's success for his popularity with constituents.

Politics 
With the imminent retirement at the 1958 election of former Prime Minister Arthur Fadden as the member for McPherson, the Country Party sought Barnes as Fadden's replacement for the safe Country seat. Apparently hesitant at first, Barnes had to be cajoled to stand and left his campaign launch early, leaving Fadden to make his own way home.

Barnes was comfortably elected at the 1958 and 1961 elections and was appointed the Minister for External Territories (later renamed Minister for Territories) in the Menzies ministry in 1963.  He was a member of Cabinet in the first Holt Ministry from January to December 1966.  At the time, External Territories was one of the most powerful ministries as it had responsibility for Papua New Guinea, the Northern Territory and the Australian Capital Territory. In this role, Barnes helped shepherd Papua New Guinea towards independence and worked on Indigenous Australian issues.

By 1964 Barnes was considered the most likely successor to Country Party leader John McEwen, whose retirement from politics was thought to be imminent. As it was, McEwen continued as Country Party leader until 1971, including serving as Prime Minister of Australia following the death of Harold Holt.

Later life 
Barnes retired from parliament at the 1972 election and returned to managing Canning Downs, where he lived until his death in 1998, aged 96, survived by his wife Barbara, two daughters and one son. In recognition of his services to horseracing, The Ceb Barnes Plate is run at Eagle Farm Race Track each November in the lead-up to the Queensland Cup.

Commonly known as "Ceb" due to his initials, Barnes was described as "a rather big, solemn man with a heavy brown moustache and keen brown eyes" and represented the image of the quintessential Australian country gentleman.

References

1901 births
1998 deaths
Members of the Australian House of Representatives for McPherson
Members of the Australian House of Representatives
Members of the Cabinet of Australia
Royal Australian Air Force officers
National Party of Australia members of the Parliament of Australia
Fellows of the Australian Academy of Technological Sciences and Engineering
20th-century Australian politicians
Royal Australian Air Force personnel of World War II